The Institute of Cast Metals Engineers (ICME), originally the British Foundrymen's Association is a British professional engineering institution founded in 1904.  It publishes the Foundry Trade Journal, which was established in 1902.

History
It was founded as the British Foundrymen's Association in 1904. It was given a Royal Charter on 25 November 1921 and became the Institute of British Foundrymen. On 11 October 2000, it changed its name to the Institute of Cast Metals Engineers.

Structure
It is licensed by the Engineering Council to assess candidates for inclusion on its Register of professional Engineers and Technicians.  The Institute's address is ICME Metalforming Centre, 47 Birmingham Road, West Bromwich, West Midlands, B70 6PY, United Kingdom.

See also 
 Chartered engineer
 Incorporated engineer
 Engineering technician

External links 
 Institute of Cast Metals Engineers

Engineering societies based in the United Kingdom
ECUK Licensed Members
Organizations established in 1904
Organisations based in the West Midlands (county)
Casting (manufacturing)